Anders Hans Karlsson (born July 22, 1959) is a Swedish scientist and agronomist working in Denmark since 1996. As of 2004, he is a professor at the University of Copenhagen's Department of Food Science.

Biography
Karlsson was born in Västerås, Sweden, and is the son of Hans Valter Karlsson (b. 1931) and Gunvor Agnes  20 km west of Västerås, in the province Västmanland.

In 1989 Karlsson received his M.Sc. degree in agricultural science (animal science and meat science), and in 1993 he received his Ph.D. degree in meat science. Both these degrees were received from the Swedish University of Agricultural Sciences in Uppsala, Sweden. In January 2004, he was appointed professor at the University of Copenhagen in meat science. Between 2004 and 2010, he also acted as the head of the Meat Science Research Section, which operated under the University of Copenhagen's Department of Food Science in Frederiksberg, Denmark. Since 2004 he is the Chairman for the Danish Meat Science Board (Kødforskningsudvalget).

In 2007, he was appointed by the EU Commission to coordinate a five-year Integrated Project under the 6th Framework Program titled Q-PorkChains. This project is one of the largest initiatives in Food Science ever supported by the EU. The total budget for the project is 20.7 million €, of which 15.0 million € comes from EU.

References 

Swedish agronomists
Swedish University of Agricultural Sciences alumni
1959 births
Living people